South East Wales was a European Parliament constituency covering south eastern Wales, including Gwent and parts of Mid Glamorgan.

Prior to its uniform adoption of proportional representation in 1999, the United Kingdom used first-past-the-post for the European elections in England, Scotland and Wales. The European Parliament constituencies used under that system were smaller than the later regional constituencies and only had one Member of the European Parliament each.

The constituency consisted of the Westminster Parliament constituencies of Aberdare, Abertillery, Bedwellty, Caerphilly, Ebbw Vale, Merthyr Tydfil, Monmouth, Newport, Pontypool, Rhondda.

The constituency was replaced by most of the similarly named South Wales East in 1984.  This became part of the much larger Wales constituency in 1999.

Members of the European Parliament

Results

References

External links
 David Boothroyd's United Kingdom Election Results

European Parliament constituencies in Wales (1979–1999)
1979 establishments in Wales
1984 disestablishments in Wales
Constituencies established in 1979
Constituencies disestablished in 1984